Qeshlaq-e Bakhtiar may refer to:
 Qeshlaq-e Bakhtiar, Ardabil
 Qeshlaq-e Bakhtiar, West Azerbaijan